The 2018 season was the New York Jets' 49th in the National Football League, their 59th overall and their fourth and final under head coach Todd Bowles. Despite starting 3–3, they lost 9 of their last 10 games. In Week 3, the Jets lost to the Browns by a score of 21–17, becoming the first team to lose to the Browns since the Chargers lost 20–17 on Christmas Eve 2016. The win by the Browns ended a 19-game winless streak. Week 6 marked the first season the Jets have scored 40+ points in multiple games since the 2008 season. They were officially mathematically eliminated from playoff contention for the 8th consecutive season after the Titans defeated the Jaguars 30–9 in Week 14. This also marks the first time since 2016 to feature pro bowlers. The Jets failed to improve on their 5–11 record from the previous season with a 38–3 blowout loss in Week 17 to the Patriots and finished 4–12 and dead last in the AFC East. Following the season finale, the Jets fired Bowles.

Draft

Draft trades
The Jets traded their first-round selection (6th overall), two second-round selections (37th and 49th overall) and a second-round selection in 2019 to Indianapolis in exchange for Indianapolis's first-round selection (3rd overall).
The Jets traded their seventh-round selection (226th overall) and defensive end Sheldon Richardson to Seattle in exchange for Seattle's second- and seventh-round selections (49th and 235th overall) and wide receiver Jermaine Kearse.
The Jets traded their fifth-round selection (143rd overall) to San Francisco in exchange for cornerback Rashard Robinson.
The Jets traded their sixth-round selection in 2017 (191st overall) to Dallas in exchange for Dallas's fifth-round selection (157th overall).

Staff

Final roster

Preseason

Regular season

Schedule

Note: Intra-division opponents are in bold text.

Game summaries

Week 1: at Detroit Lions

In their first game of the season, the Jets overcame a nightmarish start by outscoring the Lions 48-10 after Sam Darnold threw a pick 6 on his first career pass.

Week 2: vs. Miami Dolphins

Week 3: at Cleveland Browns
 With the loss, the Jets fell to 1-2 and ended the Browns 19-game winless streak.

Week 4: at Jacksonville Jaguars

Week 5: vs. Denver Broncos

Week 6: vs. Indianapolis Colts

Week 7: vs. Minnesota Vikings

Week 8: at Chicago Bears

Week 9: at Miami Dolphins

Week 10: vs. Buffalo Bills

Week 12: vs. New England Patriots

Week 13: at Tennessee Titans

With the loss, the Jets dropped to 3-9, and were mathematically eliminated from playoff contention for the eighth consecutive season after the Titans defeated the Jaguars the following Thursday night.

Week 14: at Buffalo Bills

Week 15: vs. Houston Texans

Week 16: vs. Green Bay Packers

Week 17: at New England Patriots

Standings

Division

Conference

References

External links
 

New York Jets
New York Jets seasons
New York Jets season
21st century in East Rutherford, New Jersey
Meadowlands Sports Complex